Ross Clark may refer to:
 Ross Clark (poet), Australian poet
 Ross Clark (journalist), British journalist and author
 Ross Clark (footballer), Scottish footballer
 Rylan Clark, born Ross Clark, English television and radio presenter
 Ross Clark Circle

See also